Lombardy elected its eleventh delegation to the Italian Senate on April 5, 1992. This election was a part of national Italian general election of 1992 even if, according to the Italian Constitution, every senatorial challenge in each Region is a single and independent race.

The election was won by the centrist Christian Democracy, as it happened at national level. Seven Lombard provinces gave a majority or at least a plurality to the winning party, while the Swiss-bordering Province of Varese and Province of Como preferred the federalist Northern League.

Background
After quite five decades of exceptional political stability, the election of 1992 marked a revolution. Umberto Bossi's Northern League, acting as a catch-all party, took votes from all other parties on a base of tax protest and a federalist project. Christian Democracy lost more than in the previous 30 years, the former Communists, now divided between the Democratic Party of the Left and the Communist Refoundation Party, more than ever, as well as all the other parties.

Electoral system
The electoral system for the Senate was a strange hybrid which established a form of proportional representation into FPTP-like constituencies. A candidate needed a landslide victory of more than 65% of votes to obtain a direct mandate. All constituencies where this result was not reached entered into an at-large calculation based upon the D'Hondt method to distribute the seats between the parties, and candidates with the best percentages of suffrages inside their party list were elected.

Results

|-
|- bgcolor="#E9E9E9"
!rowspan="1" align="left" valign="top"|Party
!rowspan="1" align="center" valign="top"|votes
!rowspan="1" align="center" valign="top"|votes (%)
!rowspan="1" align="center" valign="top"|seats
!rowspan="1" align="center" valign="top"|swing
|-
!align="left" valign="top"|Christian Democracy
|valign="top"|1,414,109
|valign="top"|25.2
|valign="top"|14
|valign="top"|4
|-
!align="left" valign="top"|Northern League
|valign="top"|1,150,022
|valign="top"|20.5
|valign="top"|11
|valign="top"|10
|-
!align="left" valign="top"|Democratic Party of the Left
|valign="top"|726,737
|valign="top"|12.9
|valign="top"|7
|valign="top"|3
|-
!align="left" valign="top"|Italian Socialist Party
|valign="top"|694,008
|valign="top"|12.4
|valign="top"|7
|valign="top"|1
|-
!align="left" valign="top"|Communist Refoundation
|valign="top"|316,355
|valign="top"|5.6
|valign="top"|3
|valign="top"|s/o
|-
!align="left" valign="top"|Italian Republican Party
|valign="top"|232,292
|valign="top"|4.1
|valign="top"|2
|valign="top"|=
|-
!align="left" valign="top"|Italian Social Movement
|valign="top"|197,110
|valign="top"|3.5
|valign="top"|1
|valign="top"|1
|-
!align="left" valign="top"|Federation of the Greens
|valign="top"|175,721
|valign="top"|3.1
|valign="top"|1
|valign="top"|=
|-
!align="left" valign="top"|Italian Liberal Party
|valign="top"|143,473
|valign="top"|2.6
|valign="top"|1
|valign="top"|=
|-
!align="left" valign="top"|Lombard Alpine League
|valign="top"|119,153
|valign="top"|2.1
|valign="top"|1
|valign="top"|1
|-
!align="left" valign="top"|Others
|valign="top"|452,169
|valign="top"|8.0
|valign="top"|-
|valign="top"|2
|- bgcolor="#E9E9E9"
!rowspan="1" align="left" valign="top"|Total parties
!rowspan="1" align="right" valign="top"|5,621,749
!rowspan="1" align="right" valign="top"|100.0
!rowspan="1" align="right" valign="top"|48
!rowspan="1" align="right" valign="top"|=
|}
Sources: Italian Ministry of the InteriorNote: PRC as a spinoff of PCI/PDS merged with DP.

Constituencies

|-
|- bgcolor="#E9E9E9"
!align="left" valign="top"|N°
!align="center" valign="top"|Constituency
!align="center" valign="top"|Elected
!align="center" valign="top"|Party
!align="center" valign="top"|Votes %
!align="center" valign="top"|Others
|-
|align="left"|1
|align="left"|Bergamo
|align="left"|Renato RavasioSperoni's second election
|align="left"|Christian Democracy
|align="left"|33.5%22.6%
|align="left"|seat ceded to Pagliarini
|-
|align="left"|2
|align="left"|Clusone
|align="left"|Severino CitaristiLuigi MorettiElidio De Paoli
|align="left"|Christian DemocracyNorthern LeagueLombard Alpine League
|align="left"|37.3%26.3%3.5%
|align="left"|
|-
|align="left"|3
|align="left"|Treviglio
|align="left"|Andreino CarraraGiancarlo Pagliarini
|align="left"|Christian DemocracyNorthern League
|align="left"|33.9%20.7%
|align="left"|
|-
|align="left"|4
|align="left"|Brescia
|align="left"|Mino MartinazzoliFrancesco Tabladini
|align="left"|Christian DemocracyNorthern League
|align="left"|30.8%22.3%
|align="left"|
|-
|align="left"|5
|align="left"|Breno
|align="left"|Maria Paola ColomboVittorio Marniga
|align="left"|Christian DemocracyItalian Socialist Party
|align="left"|32.9%14.0%
|align="left"|
|-
|align="left"|6
|align="left"|Chiari
|align="left"|Bruno FerrariLeoni already elected
|align="left"|Christian Democracy
|align="left"|35.4%21.4%
|align="left"|
|-
|align="left"|7
|align="left"|Salò
|align="left"|Elio FontanaLuigi Roscia
|align="left"|Christian DemocracyNorthern League
|align="left"|30.5%24.3%
|align="left"|
|-
|align="left"|8
|align="left"|Como
|align="left"|Gianfranco Miglio
|align="left"|Northern League
|align="left"|27.6%
|align="left"|
|-
|align="left"|9
|align="left"|Lecco
|align="left"|Cesare GolfariLuigi Roveda
|align="left"|Christian DemocracyNorthern League
|align="left"|29.8%22.5%
|align="left"|
|-
|align="left"|10
|align="left"|Cantù
|align="left"|Giuseppe GuzzettiElia Manara
|align="left"|Christian DemocracyNorthern League
|align="left"|28.8%25.4%
|align="left"|
|-
|align="left"|11
|align="left"|Cremona
|align="left"|Walter MontiniMarco Pezzoni
|align="left"|Christian DemocracyDemocratic Party of the Left
|align="left"|26.6%16.9%
|align="left"|
|-
|align="left"|12
|align="left"|Crema
|align="left"|Mario Campagnoli|align="left"|Christian Democracy
|align="left"|31.4%
|align="left"|
|-
|align="left"|13
|align="left"|Mantua
|align="left"|Roberto Borroni
|align="left"|Democratic Party of the Left
|align="left"|16.6%
|align="left"|Paolo Gibertoni (LN) 20.3%
|-
|align="left"|14
|align="left"|Ostiglia
|align="left"|Giuseppe ChiaranteGino Scevarolli
|align="left"|Democratic Party of the LeftItalian Socialist Party
|align="left"|25.3%14.2%
|align="left"|
|-
|align="left"|15
|align="left"|Milan 1
|align="left"|Antonio MaccanicoCarlo Scognamiglio
|align="left"|Italian Republican PartyItalian Liberal Party
|align="left"|16.6%9.0%
|align="left"|
|-
|align="left"|16
|align="left"|Milan 2
|align="left"|Giorgio CoviUnconstitutional result Unconstitutional result 
|align="left"|Italian Republican Party
|align="left"|11.1%6.2%4.5%
|align="left"|seat ceded to Restaseat ceded to Molinari
|-
|align="left"|17
|align="left"|Milan 3
|align="left"|Giuseppe Resta
|align="left"|Italian Social Movement
|align="left"|5.3%
|align="left"|
|-
|align="left"|18
|align="left"|Milan 4
|align="left"|Maccanico's second election
|align="left"|
|align="left"|12.2%
|align="left"|seat ceded to Covi
|-
|align="left"|19
|align="left"|Milan 5
|align="left"|Agata Alma CampielloEmilio Molinari
|align="left"|Italian Socialist PartyFederation of the Greens
|align="left"|13.7%4.2%
|align="left"|
|-
|align="left"|20
|align="left"|Milan 6
|align="left"|Giovanna SenesiGiorgio Ruffolo
|align="left"|Democratic Party of the LeftItalian Socialist Party
|align="left"|16.5%14.5%
|align="left"|
|-
|align="left"|21
|align="left"|Abbiategrasso
|align="left"|Achille Cutrera
|align="left"|Italian Socialist Party
|align="left"|14.5%
|align="left"|
|-
|align="left"|22
|align="left"|Rho
|align="left"|Carlo SmuragliaGiorgio GangiLuigi Vinci
|align="left"|Democratic Party of the LeftItalian Socialist PartyCommunist Refoundation
|align="left"|16.7%14.3%7.7%
|align="left"|
|-
|align="left"|23
|align="left"|Monza
|align="left"|''None elected
|align="left"|
|align="left"|
|align="left"|
|-
|align="left"|24
|align="left"|Vimercate
|align="left"|Luigi Granelli
|align="left"|Christian Democracy
|align="left"|25.7%
|align="left"|
|-
|align="left"|25
|align="left"|Lodi
|align="left"|Anna Maria Pedrazzi
|align="left"|Democratic Party of the Left
|align="left"|18.3%
|align="left"|
|-
|align="left"|26
|align="left"|Pavia
|align="left"|Pierangelo Giovannoli
|align="left"|Democratic Party of the Left
|align="left"|15.6%
|align="left"|
|-
|align="left"|27
|align="left"|Voghera
|align="left"|Luigi Meriggi
|align="left"|Communist Refoundation
|align="left"|7.7%
|align="left"|
|-
|align="left"|28
|align="left"|Vigevano
|align="left"|Carlo PisatiArmando Cossutta
|align="left"|Northern LeagueCommunist Refoundation
|align="left"|21.8%8.9%
|align="left"|
|-
|align="left"|29
|align="left"|Sondrio
|align="left"|Vittorino ColomboGiampaolo PainiFrancesco Forte
|align="left"|Christian DemocracyNorthern LeagueItalian Socialist Party
|align="left"|29.8%23.7%16.4%
|align="left"|
|-
|align="left"|30
|align="left"|Varese
|align="left"|Giuseppe ZamberlettiGiuseppe Leoni
|align="left"|Christian DemocracyNorthern League
|align="left"|26.1%25.3%
|align="left"|
|-
|align="left"|31
|align="left"|Busto Arsizio 
|align="left"|'Francesco Speroni
|align="left"|Northern League
|align="left"|27.8%
|align="left"|
|}

No senator obtained a direct mandate. Please remember that the electoral system was, in the other cases, a form of proportional representation and not a FPTP race: so candidates winning with a simple plurality could have (and usually had) a candidate (usually a Christian democrat) with more votes in their constituency.

Substitutions
Paolo Gibertoni for Mantua (20.3%) replaced Luigi Moretti in 1992. Reason: resignation.

Notes

Elections in Lombardy
1992 elections in Italy